WLLZ  may refer to:

 WLLZ (FM), a radio station (106.7 FM) licensed to serve Detroit, Michigan, United States
 WDZH, a radio station (98.7 FM) licensed to serve Detroit, Michigan, which held the call sign WLLZ from 1980 until 1996
 WXII-LD, a television station (channel 30, virtual 12) licensed to serve Cedar, Michigan, which held the call sign WLLZ-LP from 2003 until 2017
 WLQB, a radio station (93.5 FM) licensed to serve Ocean Isle Beach, North Carolina, United States which held the call sign briefly in 2019